Barnhouse Effect Co., Ltd (株式会社バーンハウスエフェクト), or BHE, is a 1997 Japanese video game developer and CG production company based in Tokyo. Most of their work has been for Takara, notably Choro Q games for the PlayStation and PlayStation 2 consoles.

Name origins 

The name "Barnhouse Effect" originates from the short story Report on the Barnhouse Effect by Kurt Vonnegut in which a professor, Arthur Barnhouse, develops telekinetic techniques.

Developed games

PlayStation 
 Deep Sea Adventure: Kaiteikyuu Panthalassa no Nazo (1997)
 Choro Q Marine: Q-Boat (1998)
 Combat Choro Q (1999)
 Choujiryokusen Microman: Generation 2000 (2000)

PlayStation 2 
 Choro Q HG (2000)
 Gadget Racers (2001) (US version)
 Penny Racers (2002) (PAL version)

 Shin Combat Choro Q (2002)
 Seek and Destroy (2002) (US version)
 Seek and Destroy (2003) (PAL version)
 Choro Q HG 4 (2003)
 ChoroQ (2004) (US version)
 ChoroQ (2005) (PAL version)
 Choro Q Works (2005)

Mobile 
 Ys I Complete Edition (2005)
 Ys I 3D (2005)
 Ys I-3D-Gaiden (2005)
 Panda-Z (2005)
 Ys II Complete Edition (2005)
 Xak: The Tower of Gazzel (2006)
 One Piece RPG (2006)

Wii 

 Choro-Q Wii (2008)
 Yatterman Wii (2008)
 Animal life (2009)

Nintendo DS 

 DS Puzzle (2006)
 A beautiful aquarium DS that moisturizes your heart (2007)
 Hoshigami (2007)
 It's tehodoki! (2007)
 Starcraft gadget robo (2008)
 Knockout people (2010)

Playstation 3 

 Blue Oasis (2010)

mixi 

 Tsukushu (2010)

PSP 

 Uncharted Waters IV (2006)
 Phi Brain (2012)

iPhone 

 Animal kitchen puzzle (2012)

Android 

 Choro-Q Grand Prix (2012)
 モノノ怪が～でぃあん ( 2013)

Nintendo 3DS 

 Alice and the magic playing cards (2011)
 Gale (2012)
 Okiraku fishing 3D (2014)

 Tank 3D (2014)

PC Games 

 Mermaid Master (2015)

Wii U 

 baseball !! SP (2013)
 Great race (2016)

CG productions

Video games 
 Soukou Kihei Votoms - Packaging CG and Opening CG
 Brave Saga - Packaging CG and Opening CG
 Kikou Heidan J-Phoenix - Packaging CG and Opening CG
 Kikou Heidan J-Phoenix 2 - Packaging CG and Opening CG
 Kirby Star Allies

Others 
 I-mode site Choro Q waiting screen

External links 
Barnhouse Effect

References 

Mass media companies based in Tokyo
Software companies based in Tokyo
Video game companies of Japan
Video game development companies